After Pearl is a 1984 video game published by SUPERware.

Gameplay
After Pearl is a game in which the Pacific naval warfare of World War II is simulated at a strategic level.

Reception
Bob DeWitt reviewed the game for Computer Gaming World, and stated that "for those who are not dyed-in-the-wool wargamers, and who simply enjoy strategic planning and maneuvering without a lot of detail, this game may prove to be a mental exercise in the power of position. You certainly can't beat the price."

References

External links
Review in Current Notes
Review in Atari Computer Enthusiasts

1984 video games